Thiago de Los Reyes Peixoto (11 November 1989 in Rio de Janeiro) is a Brazilian actor.

Career

References

External links 

1989 births
Living people
Male actors from Rio de Janeiro (city)
Brazilian male television actors
Brazilian male telenovela actors
Brazilian male film actors
Brazilian male stage actors